Alpviram (translation: Comma, half pause) is a drama television series that aired on Sony Entertainment Television in India in 1998. Produced by Shobhana Desai, the show was directed by veteran director Vipul Shah and starred Pallavi Joshi and Amir Bashir.

Plot summary 
The show, set in the city of Pune, revolves around the story of Amrita, a 21-year old vivacious girl who lives with her loving grandparents and has been dating Rohit Bakshi, a young boy from the well to do Bakshi family. On her 21st birthday, Amrita and Rohit's families plan a surprise outing for her where Rohit and Amrita get formally engaged to each other. But moments later, Amrita becomes unconscious and is rushed to the hospital where she is pronounced to be in a coma. Dr. Gupta explains that Amrita has brain aneurysms and would remain in a coma for an unspecified period of time.

Rohit and Amrita's grandparents are shattered but start taking care of Amrita till one day they realise she is pregnant and has been raped by someone at the hospital. Already reeling from financial troubles after spending their savings on her treatment, her grandparents decide to fight for justice against the hospital and its adamant administrator, Mr. Munshi, till they can find the culprit. A police investigation ensues in which everyone at the hospital is a suspect including, briefly, even Rohit. Meanwhile, the resulting scandal forces Rohit's family to ask him to choose between them and Amrita as he decides to stand by her.

Over time, as Amrita remains in a coma, Rohit eventually becomes engaged to another girl. Finally, when Amrita awakens from the coma, she must face her changed circumstances and make some tough decisions about her pregnancy, her relationship with Rohit, and her feelings towards her rapist as she attempts to comprehend her situation.

Cast 
 Pallavi Joshi as Amrita Bajaj
 Aamir Bashir as Rohit Bakshi
 Smita Bansal as Shweta Bhatnagar, a Journalist
 Anjan Srivastav as Mr. Bajaj Amrita's grandfather
 Sulabha Deshpande as Subhadra Bajaj, Amrita's grandmother
 Vikram Gokhale as Mr. Munshi, Hospital Administrator
Rajendra Gupta as Dr. Pradeep Gupta, Amrita's doctor
Mohan Gokhale as Raju, a ward boy at the Hospital
 Arun Bali as Dr. Mathur, Dean of the Hospital
 Parikshit Sahni as Mr. Bakshi, Rohit's father
 Lalan Sarang as Mrs. Bakshi, Rohit's mother
 Rasik Dave as Amit Bakshi, Rohit's elder brother
 Apara Mehta as Sunita Amit Bakshi, Amit's wife
 Sejal Shah as Madhavi Bakshi, Amit and Rohit's sister

Reception 
The show received positive reviews and years later is still considered to be a show that was ahead of its times in addressing issues of hospital malpractice, experiences of a rape survivor and Indian society's attitude towards women. It has been praised for the maturity with which it portrayed a rape survivor and her struggle.

References

External links 
 

1998 Indian television series debuts
1999 Indian television series endings
Sony Entertainment Television original programming
Indian drama television series